Victory is the fourth studio album by American disc jockey and record producer DJ Khaled. It was released on March 2, 2010, under his We the Best Music Group and Terror Squad Entertainment imprint of E1 Records.

Singles
The album's lead single, "Fed Up" featuring Usher, Young Jeezy, Rick Ross and Drake, was released on October 28, 2009. This song peaked at number 45 on the US Billboard Hot R&B/Hip Hop songs. The album version features an extra verse from rapper Lil Wayne. On December 3, 2009, the music video was released for "Fed Up" featuring Usher, Young Jeezy, Rick Ross and Drake.

The album's second single, "Put Your Hands Up" featuring Schife, Young Jeezy, Rick Ross and Plies, was released on February 8, 2010. On March 2, 2010, the music video was released for "Put Your Hands Up" featuring Schife, Young Jeezy, Rick Ross and Plies. Plies was not featured in the music video, and his part in the song skips over to Rick Ross.

The album's third single, "All I Do Is Win" featuring T-Pain, Ludacris, Rick Ross and Snoop Dogg, was released on February 8, 2010. The song peaked at number 24 on the US Billboard Hot 100, in which it became his most successful single at the time. On March 2, 2010, the music video was released for "All I Do Is Win" featuring T-Pain, Ludacris, Rick Ross and Snoop Dogg. On June 28, 2010, the music video was released for the "All I Do Is Win" (Remix) featuring T-Pain, Diddy, Nicki Minaj, Busta Rhymes, Rick Ross, Fabolous, Jadakiss, Fat Joe and Swizz Beatz.

Upon its release, "On My Way" featuring Kevin Cossom, Bali, Ace Hood, BallGreezy, Iceberg, Rum, Desloc, Triple C's member Gunplay, and Young Cash, also charted at number 16 on the US Billboard Bubbling Under Hot 100 Singles chart.

Reception

Critical reception

The album received mixed reviews. David Jeffries of AllMusic called the album a "fist-pumping song cycle of triumph in the hood". He called the five-star lineup of T-Pain, Ludacris, Snoop Dogg, and Rick Ross on "All I Do Is Win" the gold medal track, with the Young Jeezy showcase "Put Your Hands Up" winning the silver. He stated Bun B's help on the song "Rockin’ All My Chains On" helps score the bronze, giving the track a slight edge over the hood reggae number "Killing Me," which partners Busta Rhymes with Jamaican stars Buju Banton and Bounty Killer. Through intros and shout-outs, Khaled puts more of himself into this personal, story-telling album, and while this supposedly troubled effort seems complete and sound, for the most part. He disliked the closing song "Rep My City" saying that it "is the least satisfying number and is best thought of as a bonus track". In conclusion he said "(the album) is as satisfying as his other mega-star-studded albums, with the added benefit of being more cohesive and significantly more purposeful.

Edwin Ortiz of HipHopDX praised the single "Fed Up" with an all-star lineup and a catchy hook by Usher. But said the song "On My Way" got a bit tiring with eight different artists on the track. He also disliked the songs "Bring the Money Out" and "Rockin' All My Chains On". Talking about "Rockin' All My Chains On" he stated that it's almost downright unfair to put Birdman and Soulja Boy on the same song as Bun B. He applauded Nas' performance in "Victory". In conclusion he said that "We may look back on DJ Khaled’s legacy in Hip Hop and see some shining moments. However, Victory as a whole product will certainly not be one of them."

Commercial performance
The album debuted at number 14 on the US Billboard 200, number 5 on the US Top R&B/Hip-Hop Albums, and number 2 on the US Top Rap Albums charts. Behind Lil Wayne's Rebirth (2010), it sold 28,000 copies in its first week.

Track listing

Notes
 signifies a co-producer

Charts

Weekly charts

Year-end charts

References

2010 albums
DJ Khaled albums
E1 Music albums
Albums produced by the Runners
Albums produced by Drumma Boy
Albums produced by the Inkredibles